Alveolaria is a genus of fungi belonging to the family Pucciniosiraceae.

The species of this genus are found in Central America.

Species
As accepted by Species Fungorum;
Alveolaria andina 
Alveolaria cordiae 

Former species, A. duguetiae  = Dietelia duguetiae, Pucciniosiraceae

References

Pucciniales
Basidiomycota genera